Jonathan Barbe (born 26 April 1977) is a Seychellois former windsurfer and double Olympian.

Jonathan competed in the men's mistral at the 1996 Summer Olympics: The event consisted of nine races and he finished overall in 44th position Four years later, Barbe represented Seychelles again in the same event at the Sydney Olympics. The number of races was increased to eleven and he finished second from last in 35th position.

After retiring from competition, Jonathan became a sports coach.

References

External links
 
 
 

1977 births
Living people
Seychellois windsurfers
Seychellois male sailors (sport)
Olympic sailors of Seychelles
Sailors at the 1996 Summer Olympics – Mistral One Design
Sailors at the 2000 Summer Olympics – Mistral One Design